The Seikatsu Club Consumers’ Co-operative Union (SCCCU) is a Japanese federation of consumer co-operatives headquartered in Tokyo. The co-operative was formed in 1965 and has 307,000 members, most of whom are women. SCCCU is divided into groups of households who order food collectively. SCCCU offers only 3000 products, and mostly staple foods. As the co-operative is concerned with food safety, it buys organic food and shuns genetically modified organisms. SCCCU also produces its own milk and biodegradable soap.

In 1979, SCCCU started running candidates for political office through the Tokyo Seikatsusha Network and now has over 100 members who serve as local councilors.

SCCCU received a Right Livelihood Award in 1989 "for creating the most successful, sustainable model of production and consumption in the industrialised world."

Member co-operatives
 23Ku Minami ("23 Wards South") Seikatsu Club
 Kawasaki Seikatsu Club
 Kita Tokyo("North Tokyo") Seikatsu Club
 Sagami Seikatsu Club 	Fukushi ("Welfare") Club
 Seikatsu Club Aichi
 Seikatsu Club Aomori
 Seikatsu Club Chiba
 Seikatsu Club Fukushima Co-operative
 Seikatsu Club Gunma
 Seikatsu Club Hokkaido
 Seikatsu Club Ibaraki
 Seikatsu Club Iwate
 Seikatsu Club Kanagawa
 Seikatsu Club Kyoto L･Co-op
 Seikatsu Club Nagano
 Seikatsu Club Nara
 Seikatsu Club Ohsaka
 Seikatsu Club Saitama
 Seikatsu Club Shizuoka
 Seikatsu Club Tochigi
 Seikatsu Club Tokyo
 Seikatsu Club Yamagata Co-operative
 Seikatsu Club Yamanashi
 Syonan Seikatsu Club
 Tama Kita("Tama North") Seikatsu Club
 Tama Minami ("Tama South") Seikatsu Club
 Yokohama Kita("Yokohama North") Seikatsu Club
 Yokohama Minami ("Yokohama South") Seikatsu Club

References

External links
Official website
 Portrait on Right Livelihood Award

Cooperative federations
Cooperatives in Japan
Organizations established in 1965